Ponale is a station on Line 5 of the Milan Metro.

History 
The works for the construction of the first section of Line 5, which includes Ponale station, began in September 2007, and it was opened on 10 February 2013.

Station structure 
Ponale is an underground station with two tracks in one tunnel and, like all the other stations on Line 5, is wheelchair accessible.
 
It is located at the intersection of Viale Fulvio Testi, Via Ponale and Via Chiese, but has exits only to Viale Fulvio Testi.

Interchanges 
Tram line 31 and bus stops are located near the station.

Note 

Line 5 (Milan Metro) stations
Railway stations opened in 2013
2013 establishments in Italy
Railway stations in Italy opened in the 21st century